Tony Álvarez (1918 - March 18, 2001)  was a famous Cuban singer and television actor and personality in the 1940s and the 1950s. He had started music early and was the host of the Cuban radio musical program Ritmos del Plata. He met Olga Chorens, a Cuban female singer during the broadcast and the duo were a sensation in Cuba known as Olga y Tony and got married. They both played with Orquesta Rió De La Plata.

In 1951, they became co-hosts and co-stars of the popular entertainment show on Televisora CMQ in Cuba. The programme was "El Show de Olga y Tony", a live daily platform with live orchestra made up of renowned artists like Laito Castro on piano, Israel López "Cachao" on bass, Rolando Laserie on percussions. All guests performed live with choir accompaniment whenever necessary. Tony and Olga would also perform various songs during the broadcast.

With the beginning of the Cuban revolution and arrival of Fidel Castro, the couple went into exile in 1963 and lived in Mexico and later in Miami, New York and Puerto Rico. He also worked for some time in Spain

They are the parents of Cuban singer, songwriter, and record producer Lissette Álvarez, and recording artist and news anchor Olga Alvarez.

Place of death missing
Cuban male singers
Place of birth missing
Cuban male television actors
1918 births
2001 deaths